Stephen Woodcock may refer to:

 Steven Woodcock (born 1964), English actor
 Stephen Woodcock (politician), New Hampshire politician
 Steven Woodcock (film director) (born 1961), British film director, writer, and producer